"Put Yourself in My Place" is a song written by the Motown team of Holland–Dozier–Holland and recorded by at least four Motown recording acts during the sixties: The Elgins in 1965, The Supremes, Chris Clark and The Isley Brothers in 1966.

Cash Box described the Supremes' version as a "traditional blueser".

Charts
The Elgins and Supremes' versions were both issued as B-Sides in 1966, but in 1969, the Isleys' version gave the brothers a hit with it when Tamla Motown re-issued the single for the British market after they had left the company and just scored a US million-seller, "It's Your Thing" for their own T-Neck label. The song went to #13 on the UK Singles Chart, higher than their American big hit of the same year. Similarly, a 1971 Tamla Motown reissue of The Elgins' version as an A side (as a follow-up to their then-recent UK Top 3 hit, "Heaven Must Have Sent You") gave the group a Top 30 hit (#28).

Credits

The Elgins' version
Album: Darling Baby
A-side: "Darling Baby" (1966)
B-side: "It's Gonna Be Hard Times" (1971)
Lead vocals by Saundra Mallett Edwards
Backing vocals by Johnny Dawson, Cleo "Duke" Miller, and Norman McLean
Instrumentation by The Funk Brothers

The Supremes' version
Album: The Supremes A' Go-Go
A-side: "You Can't Hurry Love"
Lead vocals by Diana Ross
Background vocals by Florence Ballard and Mary Wilson
Instrumentation by The Funk Brothers

The Isley Brothers' version
B-side: "Little Miss Sweetness"
Lead vocals by Ronald Isley
Background vocals by O'Kelly Isley Jr. and Rudolph Isley
Instrumentation by The Funk Brothers

Chris Clark version
A-side: "Love's Gone Bad"
Lead vocals by Chris Clark
Instrumentation by The Funk Brothers

Chart performance

The Elgins version

The Isley Brothers version

References

1965 singles
1966 singles
1969 singles
The Elgins songs
The Isley Brothers songs
The Supremes songs
Songs written by Holland–Dozier–Holland
Motown singles
Song recordings produced by Brian Holland
Song recordings produced by Lamont Dozier
1965 songs